Road signs in the Czech Republic are regulated by the Ministry of Transport and the police. The signs are nearly the same as the European norm, but with small changes (e.g., the text is in Czech, some differences in colour). The law governing the road signs is Decree number 30/2001 Sb., many times amended, and replaced by decree 294/2015 Sb., in force since 1 January 2016.

Czech road signs depict people with realistic (as opposed to stylized) silhouettes.

Dimensions (mm)

Warning signs

Priority signs

Prohibitive or restrictive signs

Mandatory signs

Direction, position or indication signs

Informational, facilities or service signs maker signs, etc.

Czech Republic